() is a small non-governmental organization based in Antananarivo, Madagascar, with the mission of developing economically and ecologically sustainable management of the natural resources in parts of Madagascar.

The organization works in five different areas outside of Antananarivo, with a common focus being ecotourism, medicinal plants, and experimental agriculture as alternatives to environmental degradation for local communities.  One of the main areas it serves is the Vohimana Reserve, adjacent to Andasibe-Mantadia National Park.

Man and the Environment accepts foreign volunteers and researchers on long-term and short-term assignments, for a charge. Some knowledge of French is preferable but not required.

External links 
 Official English-language website for Man and the Environment
 Official French-language website for L'Homme et L'Environnement
 Organization reporting on Man and the Environment's work
 Conference report abstract on Man and the Environment's work
 Short conference description of Man and the Environment's work

Environmental organisations based in Madagascar